The Speaker of the South Carolina House of Representatives is the presiding officer of the South Carolina House of Representatives, whose main role is to ensure that general order is maintained in the house by recognizing members to speak, ensuring members are following established rules, and to call for votes. The speaker is third in third in the line of succession behind the lieutenant governor and the president of the senate. The current speaker is Murrell Smith, Jr., a Republican who has held the position since May 12, 2022.

History

James Parsons was the first speaker of the South Carolina House of Representatives, elected in 1776 after the adoption of South Carolina's first constitution. Since 1776, there have been sixty-one speakers of the house. Four speakers have served non-consecutive terms, but unlike the office of governor where each office holder is counted once regardless of terms served, speakers are counted separately for each time in office. Therefore, for example, Solomon Blatt Sr. was the 50th and the 53rd speaker.

Election

The speaker is elected by a simple majority vote to a four year term following the most recent general election and may not serve more than five consecutive terms.  The next election will be in 2023. Incumbent Speaker Murrell Smith was elected intra-term in 2022 following the resignation of Jay Lucas. Since 1776, there have been 34 Democrats, 9 Democratic-Republicans, 8 Republicans, 8 Independents, and 2 Nullifiers. The speaker pro tempore presides in the speaker's absence.

Roles and Responsibilities
The speaker of the house "preserve[s] order and decorum" in the chamber and oversees the proceeding of the House of Representatives by recognizing members to speak, calling for votes, and maintaining general order. The speaker also serves an ex officio member of the Committee on Operations and Managementof the House of Representatives. Additionally, the speaker of the house has the ability to do the following:

Call for a special election after an inter-term vacancy in the senate
Appoint members all committees, but must ensure that both the majority and minority parties are represented 
Adjourn the house without a vote in cases of emergency
If a quorum is not present, the speaker may order absent members to be taken into custody and brought into the house chamber.

Succession to Governorship 
The speaker of the house is third in the gubernatorial line of succession. If the governor, lieutenant governor, and President of the South Carolina Senate are unable to serve as governor, the speaker of the house becomes governor. Since the role of lieutenant governor was separated from president of the senate, no president has succeeded to the office of governor.

List of Speakers

Notes+

References

South Carolina General Assembly